Nogometni klub Slaven Živinice, commonly known as Slaven Živinice or just Slaven is a professional association football club based in the city of Živinice that is situated in Bosnia and Herzegovina.

Slaven currently plays in the Second League of the Federation of Bosnia and Herzegovina (Group North) and plays its home matches at the Gradski Stadion (City Stadium) in Živinice, which has a capacity of 500 seats.

Honours

Domestic

League
Second League of the Federation of Bosnia and Herzegovina:
Winners (2): 2008–09 , 2016–17

References

External links
NK Slaven Živinice at Facebook

NK Slaven Živinice
Sport in the Federation of Bosnia and Herzegovina
Football clubs in Bosnia and Herzegovina
1936 establishments in Bosnia and Herzegovina